The standardized railway station was a type of station constructed primarily on branch lines for the Royal Württemberg State Railways. Between 1892 and approximately 1903, 59 such stations were constructed in Württemberg in three different versions.

History 
The original intention of the government of the Kingdom of Württemberg was to leave the construction of branch lines to private companies. However, when only a few companies took up the offer, a law to enable the construction of the first state branch line was passed in 1887. The line in question, the Schiltach-Schramberg railway, ran from Nagold to Altensteig and was followed soon afterwards by the Swabian Alb Railway from Reutlingen to Honau and the Kocher Valley Railway from Waldenburg to Künzelsau. However, the state had limited funds and relied on financial contributions from local authorities along the route; the villages, however, had limited spending power and budgetary restrictions were extended to railway stations.

Some individually designed stations were still to be seen along the Schiltach-Schramberg route (opened October 1892), the Nagold-Altensteig route (opened December 1891) and the Reutlingen-Honau route (opened June 1892). The stretch from Waldenburg-Künzelsau, which was opened in October 1892, was the first to see station buildings standardized on grounds of cost. In contrast to similar buildings on the stretch from Reutlingen–Honau, the stations here were of a simpler design with hip roofs abandoned in favour of gabled roofs.

Until approximately 1903, the standardized railway station was built on all new branch lines of the Royal Württemberg State Railways and again, in 1908 and 1911 respectively, on the Wieslauf Valley Railway at Rudersberg and Welzheim. It was the only railway station of standard design to be constructed across the whole kingdom. However, by the beginning of the 20th century, the standardized railway station with its Swiss chalet style was deemed out of keeping with a period which favoured the up-and-coming Domestic Revival style (Heimatstil).

Defunct railway companies of Germany
Transport in Baden-Württemberg
Kingdom of Württemberg
Railway stations in Baden-Württemberg
History of rail transport in Baden-Württemberg